Yury Alyaksandrovich Ryzhko (born 10 October 1989) is a Belarusian former professional footballer.

Career
On 1 August 2013 he signed a contract with FK Buxoro to play in the Uzbek League. He made his debut for FK Buxoro on 4 August 2013 in Tashkent in a league match against Pakhtakor Tashkent.

On 20 February 2018, the BFF banned him from football for life for his involvement in the match-fixing.

Honours
BATE Borisov
Belarusian Premier League champion: 2008

References

External links
 

1989 births
Living people
Footballers from Minsk
Belarusian footballers
Association football defenders
Belarusian expatriate footballers
Expatriate footballers in Uzbekistan
Belarusian expatriate sportspeople in Uzbekistan
FC BATE Borisov players
FC Smorgon players
FC Torpedo-BelAZ Zhodino players
Buxoro FK players
Navbahor Namangan players
FC Slutsk players
FC Isloch Minsk Raion players
FC Naftan Novopolotsk players
FC Smolevichi players